is a Japanese idol anime television series produced by Seven Arcs Pictures and Happy Elements. It is a "hybrid anime", where the first half of the show is a typical animation and the second half is a live-action segment featuring the anime's voice actresses.

Katsuya Kikuchi directed the anime with scripts written by Hiroshi Oonogi, and I've Sound produced the music. Idol Memories debuted on October 3, 2016 on Tokyo MX with further airings on AT-X.

Summary
The series is set in the near future, where live idol music performances in virtual reality have become common across the globe. Many wannabe idols decide to join prestigious idol training academies in order to polish their skills and emerge victorious.

In this setting two idol groups, StarRing and Shadow, compete against each other in order to win the coveted 'tiara', which represents the no.1 spot in the 'Idol League'.

Characters

StarRing

Honest and cheerful, she can always put the other members in a good mood. She often goes to karaoke to train her singing skills.

The oldest of the StarRing members and the self-appointed leader of the group. She looks like a knowledgeable older sister, but she's actually an airhead.

A girl with idol-like adorableness. She decided to become an idol because she admired her great-grandmother, who was a stage actress.

Shadow

A serious and dependable girl. Despite being the youngest member, she's the leader of Shadow. She is mature and acts that way, but sometimes has a childish side.

A super-lazy girl who wants to become an idol, but lacks the motivation to work for it.

A demure girl who's easily embarrassed and shy in front of new people. She is an indoor type.

Kanon Private Academy

Shirayuki is the director of the Kanon Private Academy.

Kataoka is the deputy director of the Kanon Private Academy.

Crimson Star Academy

The main antagonist of the anime series, Hayami is the director of the Crimson Star Academy.

Hayami's lackey. He also works undercover as a Kanon Academy student to help hack the top ranking.

Episode list

References

External links
 
 

Tokyo MX original programming
Japanese idols in anime and manga
Seven Arcs
2016 anime television series debuts
2016 Japanese television series endings